Crónicas de un Laberinto is the fifth album recorded by Mexican rock band Jaguares. The LP was released on May 27, 2005 under the label Sony Music International.

Jaguares are:

 Saul Hernández (lead voice and assistant guitar)
 Alfonso André (drums, programming and sequences)
 César "Vampiro" López (main guitar)

Guest artists include: Adrian Belew (guitar, chorus, koto and keyboards), Federico Fong (bass), and Leonardo Muñoz (percussions and programming).

Track listing

Sales and certifications

References

2005 albums
Jaguares (band) albums